Rev Theophilus Houlbrooke FRSE LLB (1745–1824) was a British minister remembered mainly as an amateur botanist. He served as President of the Liverpool Athenaeum from 1809 until 1813.

Life

He was born in Lichfield in Staffordshire in 1745. He was educated at Shrewsbury School. He trained as a minister at Cambridge University graduating LLB and was Ordained as a Deacon in Lincoln Cathedral in 1769, whilst also serving of Curate of the nearby church in Little Coates. From 1770 until 1784 he served as rector of the church in Stockton-on-Teme.  Around 1785 he left the Church of England to join the Unitarians.

In 1792 he was elected a Fellow of the Royal Society of Edinburgh for his contributions to botany. His proposers were Sir James Hall, John Playfair and Andrew Coventry.

In 1802 he was an invited guest at the opening of the new Botanic Garden in Liverpool under the Presidency of William Roscoe. He was placed on the Committee alongside other illustrious persons such as James Currie FRS.

His will, of January 1824, is held by the National Archive at Kew.

References

1745 births
1824 deaths
People from Lichfield
Alumni of the University of Cambridge
British botanists
Fellows of the Royal Society of Edinburgh
18th-century English Anglican priests
English Unitarian ministers